Robert Peters (born 15 November 1970) is an Antiguan former cyclist. He competed in two events at the 1992 Summer Olympics.

References

External links
 

1970 births
Living people
Antigua and Barbuda male cyclists
Olympic cyclists of Antigua and Barbuda
Cyclists at the 1992 Summer Olympics
Place of birth missing (living people)